Ostrovo or Ostrvo ( or Острво; meaning "island" in Serbian) was the largest Serbian river island on the Danube, with an area of .

Characteristics 

Today it is no longer an island but peninsula, which is connected to the southern bank of the Danube. Ostrovo lies east of Belgrade, near Kostolac, and is heavily forested. It has given its name to a village of Ostrovo in municipality of Kostolac. The southern arm of Danube around Ostrovo is called Dunavac.

Natural gas 

In the early 2000, reserves of the natural gas were discovered on Ostrovo. Potential reserves were estimated to 200 million cubic meters with the possible production of 10,000 cubic meters per day for 12 years. Profitability index was estimated to 1:7 and the extraction could start in 2001. Reserves of the paraffin petroleum were also discovered. Based on this, a big underground gas storage and a regional pipeline to Smederevo and Požarevac were proposed. Even though by 2003 everything was prepared for the works to begin, by 2017 there was no progress at all.

There are four wells, with daily production reaching  by November 2021. The storage station "Ostrovo" was built  from Kostolac, and adapted to produce liquid, compressed natural gas, which mainly consists of methane. The gas can be used as a fuel, and is shipped four times per day from Ostrovo, mostly for industrial use.

See also

List of islands of Serbia

References

River islands of Serbia
Islands of the Danube